Tuna is a locality situated in Vimmerby Municipality, Kalmar County, Sweden with 227 inhabitants in 2010.

References 

Populated places in Kalmar County
Populated places in Vimmerby Municipality